Absorbed dose  is a dose quantity which is the measure of the energy deposited in matter by ionizing radiation per unit mass. Absorbed dose is used in the calculation of dose uptake in living tissue in both radiation protection (reduction of harmful effects), and radiology (potential beneficial effects for example in cancer treatment). It is also used to directly compare the effect of radiation on inanimate matter such as in radiation hardening.

The SI unit of measure is the gray (Gy), which is defined as one Joule of energy absorbed per kilogram of matter. The older, non-SI CGS unit rad,  is sometimes also used, predominantly in the USA.

Deterministic effects
Conventionally, in radiation protection, unmodified absorbed dose is only used for indicating the immediate health effects due to high levels of acute dose. These are tissue effects, such as in acute radiation syndrome, which are also known as deterministic effects. These are effects which are certain to happen in a short time.

Effects of acute radiation exposure

Radiation therapy

The measurement of absorbed dose in tissue is of fundamental importance in radiobiology  as it is the measure of the amount of energy the incident radiation is imparting to the target tissue.

Dose computation
The absorbed dose is equal to the radiation exposure (ions or C/kg) of the radiation beam multiplied by the ionization energy of the medium to be ionized.

When the absorbed dose is not uniform, or when it is only applied to a portion of a body or object, an absorbed dose representative of the entire item can be calculated by taking a mass-weighted average of the absorbed doses at each point.

More precisely,

Where
  is the mass-averaged absorbed dose of the entire item T
  is the item of interest
  is the absorbed dose as a function of location
  is the density as a function of location
  is volume

Medical considerations
Non-uniform absorbed dose is common for soft radiations such as low energy x-rays or beta radiation. Self-shielding means that the absorbed dose will be higher in the tissues facing the source than deeper in the body.

The mass average can be important in evaluating the risks of radiotherapy treatments, since they are designed to target very specific volumes in the body, typically a tumour. For example, if 10% of a patient's bone marrow mass is irradiated with 10 Gy of radiation locally, then the absorbed dose in bone marrow overall would be 1 Gy. Bone marrow makes up 4% of the body mass, so the whole-body absorbed dose would be 0.04 Gy. The first figure (10 Gy) is indicative of the local effects on the tumour, while the second and third figure (1 Gy and 0.04 Gy) are better indicators of the overall health effects on the whole organism. Additional dosimetry calculations would have to be performed on these figures to arrive at a meaningful effective dose, which is needed to estimate the risk of cancer or other stochastic effects.

When ionizing radiation is used to treat cancer, the doctor will usually prescribe the radiotherapy treatment in units of gray. Medical imaging doses may be described in units of coulomb per kilogram, but when radiopharmaceuticals are used, they will usually be administered in units of becquerel.

Stochastic risk - conversion to equivalent dose

For stochastic radiation risk, defined as the probability of cancer induction and genetic effects occurring over a long time scale, consideration must be given to the type of radiation and the sensitivity of the irradiated tissues, which requires the use of modifying factors to produce a risk factor in sieverts. One sievert carries with it a 5.5% chance of eventually developing cancer based on the linear no-threshold model. This calculation starts with the absorbed dose.

To represent stochastic risk the dose quantities equivalent dose H T and effective dose E are used, and appropriate dose factors and coefficients are used to calculate these from the absorbed dose. Equivalent and effective dose quantities are expressed in units of the sievert or rem which implies that biological effects have been taken into account. The derivation of stochastic risk is in accordance with the recommendations of the International Committee on Radiation Protection (ICRP) and International Commission on Radiation Units and Measurements (ICRU). The coherent system of radiological protection quantities developed by them is shown in the accompanying diagram.

For whole body radiation, with Gamma rays or x-rays the modifying factors are numerically equal to 1, which means that in that case the dose in grays equals the dose in sieverts.

Development of the absorbed dose concept and the gray

Wilhelm Röntgen first discovered X-rays on November 8, 1895, and their use spread very quickly for medical diagnostics, particularly broken bones and embedded foreign objects where they were a revolutionary improvement over previous techniques.

Due to the wide use of X-rays and the growing realisation of the dangers of ionizing radiation, measurement standards became necessary for radiation intensity and various countries developed their own, but using differing definitions and methods. Eventually, in order to promote international standardisation, the first International Congress of Radiology (ICR) meeting in London in 1925, proposed a separate body to consider units of measure. This was called the International Commission on Radiation Units and Measurements, or ICRU, and came into being at the Second ICR in Stockholm in 1928, under the chairmanship of Manne Siegbahn.

One of the earliest techniques of measuring the intensity of X-rays was to measure their ionising effect in air by means of an air-filled ion chamber. At the first ICRU meeting it was proposed that one unit of X-ray dose should be defined as the quantity of X-rays that would produce one esu of charge in one cubic centimetre of dry air at 0 °C and 1 standard atmosphere of pressure. This unit of radiation exposure was named the roentgen in honour of Wilhelm Röntgen, who had died five years previously. At the 1937 meeting of the ICRU, this definition was extended to apply to gamma radiation. This approach, although a great step forward in standardisation, had the disadvantage of not being a direct measure of the absorption of radiation, and thereby the ionisation effect, in various types of matter including human tissue, and was a measurement only of the effect of the X-rays in a specific circumstance; the ionisation effect in dry air.

In 1940, Louis Harold Gray, who had been studying the effect of neutron damage on human tissue, together with William Valentine Mayneord and the radiobiologist John Read, published a paper in which a new unit of measure, dubbed the "gram roentgen" (symbol: gr) was proposed, and defined as "that amount of neutron radiation which produces an increment in energy in unit volume of tissue equal to the increment of energy produced in unit volume of water by one roentgen of radiation".  This unit was found to be equivalent to 88 ergs in air, and made the absorbed dose, as it subsequently became known, dependent on the interaction of the radiation with the irradiated material, not just an expression of radiation exposure or intensity, which the roentgen represented. In 1953 the ICRU recommended the rad, equal to 100 erg/g, as the new unit of measure of absorbed radiation. The rad was expressed in coherent cgs units.

In the late 1950s, the CGPM invited the ICRU to join other scientific bodies to work on the development of the International System of Units, or SI. It was decided to define the SI unit of absorbed radiation as energy deposited per unit mass which is how the rad had been defined, but in MKS units it would be J/kg. This was confirmed in 1975 by the 15th CGPM, and the unit was named the "gray" in honour of Louis Harold Gray, who had died in 1965. The gray was equal to 100 rad, the cgs unit.

Other uses
Absorbed dose is also used to manage the irradiation and measure the effects of ionising radiation on inanimate matter in a number of fields.

Component survivability
Absorbed dose is used to rate the survivability of devices such as electronic components in ionizing radiation environments.

Radiation hardening
The measurement of absorbed dose absorbed by inanimate matter is vital in the process of radiation hardening which improves the resistance of electronic devices to radiation effects.

Food irradiation

Absorbed dose is the physical dose quantity used to ensure irradiated food has received the correct dose to ensure effectiveness. Variable doses are used depending on the application and can be as high as 70 kGy.

Radiation-related quantities
The following table shows radiation quantities in SI and non-SI units:

Although the United States Nuclear Regulatory Commission permits the use of the units curie, rad, and rem alongside SI units, the European Union European units of measurement directives required that their use for "public health ... purposes" be phased out by 31 December 1985.

See also
 Kerma (physics)
 Mean glandular dose
 :Category:Units of radiation dose

Notes

References

Literature

External links
 Specific Gamma-Ray Dose Constants for Nuclides Important to Dosimetry and Radiological Assessment, Laurie M. Unger and D. K . Trubey, Oak Ridge National Laboratory, May 1982 - contains gamma-ray dose constants (in tissue) for approximately 500 radionuclides.

Physical quantities
Radiobiology
Radiation protection